The Los Angeles County Health Agency is Los Angeles County's consolidated health agency, comprising the Los Angeles County Department of Health Services, the United States' second largest municipal hospital system, 
Mental Health, the United States' largest municipal mental health system, and 
Public Health. The Health Agency was established to coordinate and streamline the county's physical health, public health, and behavioral health care services, programs, and policies under a single integrated system of care. The Health Agency is presently led by Fred Leaf as interim director.

The County Health Agency employs 31,887 employees.

History
From 1972 to 1978, the Los Angeles County Department of Health (now the Department of Health Services) provided the full continuum of physical, mental and public health services and functions. However, in 1978, the county established the Department of Mental Health to provide behavioral health services, amid concerns that funding for mental health services was being diverted to the county's hospitals. In 2006, the Department of Public Health was separated from the Department of Health Services, during a major budget deficit.

On January 13, 2015, the Los Angeles County Board of Supervisors publicly directed the Chief Executive Office to assess the feasibility of consolidating the county's three health departments into a single unified health agency. This was preceded by correspondence between the Board and Mitchell Katz, the then current director of Health Services, who had submitted a confidential proposal to integrate the three departments on January 2, 2015.

On October 6, 2015, the Board adopted an ordinance to create the Health Agency, effective November 5, 2015. The proposal was criticized by community advocates, providers, and labor unions, who have argued that physical health services would be prioritized above mental and public health services, and potential conflicts of interest. The Health Agency is led by the Health Agency Director, who oversees, manages, coordinates, monitors and evaluates the Agency's programs and services.

During the COVID-19 pandemic the department was criticized for its handling of nursing homes.

See also

Los Angeles County Department of Health Services
Los Angeles County Department of Mental Health
Los Angeles County Department of Public Health

References

External links

Los Angeles County Department of Health Services official website
Los Angeles County Department of Mental Health official website
Los Angeles County Department of Public Health official website

Health departments in California
County government agencies in California
Government of Los Angeles County, California
Hospital networks in the United States
Healthcare in Los Angeles
Government agencies established in 2015